The Beautiful Angel (La Belle Angèle) is an 1889 painting by Paul Gauguin, now in the Musée d'Orsay in Paris. Its title derives from a nickname for its subject, Angélique Marie Satre (1868-1932) - she was one of three famous innkeepers in Pont-Aven, where the work was produced. Its style is heavily influenced by the 'Japonism' then fashionable in Paris, particularly by a canvas by Hokusai.

See also
 List of paintings by Paul Gauguin

References

Portraits of women
19th-century portraits
1889 paintings
Paintings by Paul Gauguin
Paintings in the collection of the Musée d'Orsay